The Battle of Landen, also known as Neerwinden, took place on 29 July 1693, during the Nine Years' War near  Landen in modern Belgium. A French army under Marshal Luxembourg defeated an Allied force led by William III.

By 1693, all combatants were struggling with the financial and material costs of the conflict. Hoping to end the war with a favourable negotiated peace, Louis XIV of France decided first to improve his position by taking the offensive. Luxembourg, French commander in the Spanish Netherlands saw a chance to engage William near Landen. The allies were in a strong but extremely dangerous position, with a river to their rear. 

Most of the fighting took place on the Allied right, around the only bridge over the river, which was strongly fortified and defended by the bulk of their artillery. The French assaulted the position three times before finally breaking through the defences; the Allies were forced to retreat and abandon their guns. 

Although a clear French victory, as with the Battle of Steenkerque the previous year, Louis failed to achieve the decisive result that would force the Allies to negotiate peace. William quickly replaced his losses and by 1694 had achieved numerical superiority in Flanders for the first time in the war.

Background
Since the outbreak of the Nine Years' War, the French had generally had the better of operations in the Spanish Netherlands, capturing Namur in 1692 and winning a significant victory at Steenkerque in 1693. However, they had failed to achieve a decisive victory or split up the Grand Alliance, while attempts to restore James II had been ended by the Treaty of Limerick in 1691, followed by an Anglo-Dutch naval victory at La Hogue in 1692. For the first time, the strategic situation seemed to be moving in favour of the Allies.

However, by now all sides were struggling with economic downturns and famine caused by the Little Ice Age, a prolonged period of colder weather exacerbated by war. After four poor years, the 1693 harvest failed completely throughout Europe, causing catastrophic famine; between 1695 and 1697, an estimated two million died of starvation in Southern France and Northern Italy alone. Conducting military campaigns in these circumstances was made problematic by an increase in the average size of armies from 25,000 in 1648 to over 100,000 by 1697. Such levels were unsustainable for pre-industrial economies and they fell back to around 35,000 in the subsequent 1701 to 1704 War of the Spanish Succession. 

These factors particularly affected France, which was also fighting a multi-front war on its own and needed peace, but Louis XIV of France always sought to improve his position before negotiating. In doing so, he held two key advantages over his opponents, an undivided command and vastly superior logistics. This allowed the French to mount offensives at least month earlier than the Allies, quickly seize their objectives and then assume a defensive posture. In 1693, Louis took the offensive in the Rhineland, Flanders and Catalonia. When the attack in Germany proved unexpectedly successful, in early June Luxembourg was ordered to reinforce it with 28,000 of his own troops and prevent the Allies doing the same. Louis also ordered Luxembourg to capture Liège, the capital of the Prince-Bishopric of Liège.

Prelude

Luxembourg increased his field force to 116,000 by stripping garrisons from towns throughout Maritime Flanders, including Dunkirk and Ypres. On 9 June, he embarked on a series of marches, simultaneously threatening Liège, Huy and Charleroi; the Governor of the Spanish Netherlands, Maximilian of Bavaria, insisted on covering all three, forcing the Allies to divide their army of 120,000.

However, the number of troops available to Luxembourg was not enough to lay siege to Liège while also keeping the Allied main force at bay. William III took advantage of the impasse in French strategy to send Lieutenant-General Ferdinand Willem of Wurttemberg with a corps of 15,000-16,000 men to the northern French province of Artois. He had orders to collect contributions and, if the inhabitants refused to pay, to reduce their houses and farms to ashes. Wurttemburg engaged the French, under La Vallette, on 18 July and broke through the lines of the Scheldt near Dottignies. The inhabitants of Artois ended up paying contributions amounting to 6 million guilders.

On 18 July, Luxembourg ordered Villeroy to move against the small fortress town of Huy; the Allies marched to its relief, but before they could do so, the town surrendered on 23 July. William now halted and reinforced Liège with an additional ten battalions, bringing the garrison to 17,000. His remaining troops established a line running in a rough semicircle from Eliksem on the right, to Neerwinden on the left; although this provided flexibility of response, movement was restricted by the Little Geete River, three kilometres to the rear.

Seeing an opportunity, on 28 July Luxembourg reversed his route, and after a forced march of 30 kilometres, arrived at the village of Landen in the early evening. Luxembourg assumed that William would retreat and wait for the return of Würtemberg's corps before risking a battle. William was notified of the French approach by mid-afternoon, but despite being advised to slip across the river at night, he decided to stand and fight and to let Würtemberg complete his mission. His main reason appears to have been that his shortage of mounted troops made an orderly retreat problematic, while the ground selected presented a good opportunity to inflict heavy casualties on the French cavalry. Although he was outnumbered by 66,000 to 50,000 and the area enclosed by his troops was too restricted to allow them to manoeuvre freely, the small battlefield would also prevent Luxembourg from making full use of his superior numbers. 

The Allied right was key to the position, as it protected their only line of retreat across the Geete. They constructed strong defences, anchored by the villages of Laar and Neerwinden; 80 of their 91 pieces of heavy artillery were placed behind them. In the centre, the open ground between Neerwinden and Neerlanden was solidly entrenched with the village of Rumsdorp as an advance post. The left, which rested on Landen brook and was the hardest to attack, saw little action until the end of the battle. Luxembourg concentrated his main assault force of 28,000 men against the Allied right, while his subordinates carried out secondary attacks on their left and centre, to prevent it being reinforced. These would be carried out by three lines of cavalry, supported by two lines of infantry and a further three lines of cavalry behind while a strong force of infantry and dragoons attacked Rumsdorp.

Battle

The French bombardment began at 8:00 am and an hour later, 28 battalions attacked along the line from Laar and Neerwinden; after fierce house to house fighting, they had captured Laar and the Allied troops in Neerwinden had been driven to the very edge of the village. Their right flank was close to collapse but the diversionary attacks on the centre and left did not materialise, allegedly because Villeroy claimed he had not received orders to do so. The Allies were able to reinforce Neerwinden, counterattack and drive the French from both villages.

A second assault led by the Prince de Conti was also repulsed before Luxembourg took 7,000 infantry from his centre and left wing for a third attempt. As William moved additional units to meet this threat, de Feuquières ordered his cavalry to charge; among them was the Irish Brigade, who suffered severe losses, including the Irish Jacobite hero Patrick Sarsfield, but the French over-ran the Allied entrenchments, inflicting heavy casualties. 

The French breakthrough happened round 15:00 and an hour later William ordered the Allies to retreat over the Geete. Doing so they abandoned most of their artillery which was entrenched and could not be withdrawn in time. The Allied left wing under Henry Casimir II retreated in good order to Dormael castle and then northwards to Diest, but the right wing experienced more trouble.  Nine battalions of Dutch infantry under Count Solms fought a stubborn rearguard action, supported by several British units holding positions around the bridge and cavalry charges led by William himself. Solms was killed and a few hundred allied horsemen drowned trying to cross the Geete, but by 17:00 most of the army had reached the other side of the river and continued their retreat, undisturbed by the French cavalry.

Aftermath 

This was Luxembourg's last battle; he died in January 1695, depriving Louis of his best general. Landen might have been a crushing victory if the simultaneous attacks he ordered on the Allied left and centre had been made as planned. As it was, both sides suffered heavy casualties; the Allies lost around 12,000 killed or wounded, with another 2,000 captured, mostly Dutch troops cut off in Rumsdorp, which they held for most of the day. The French suffered at least 10,000 casualties, with some estimates suggesting losses of over 15,000; a visitor to the area in 1707 noted the fields were still scattered with the bones of the dead.

William had a silver medal struck to celebrate his success in 'saving Liege' and escaping with the bulk of his troops. This was partly propaganda to counter the Battle of Lagos on 27 June, when the French intercepted a large Anglo-Dutch convoy and inflicted serious commercial damage. However, there was also truth to the claim since William had escaped possible disaster and was able to quickly replace his losses, leaving the French little to show for their hard-fought victory. Luxembourg's infantry was so battered that he indeed had to refrain from besieging Liège and a mutiny even broke out in the French army. Entire regiments rioted and demanded payment of back pay in threatening fashion. Louis XIV sent money and ordered Luxembourg to return to the French border to reassure the troops that they did not have to fight another battle. For this reason the battle has also been described as a Pyrrhic victory.

Although Luxembourg has been criticised for failing to exploit his victory, his troops were exhausted, while the poor harvests of previous years meant a lack of forage for the horses and baggage train needed to pursue his opponents. The problem was so acute that capturing the Allied artillery proved a mixed blessing, as the French scarcely had sufficient to move their own. The offensive came to an end, although Charleroi was captured in October.

Legacy

Laurence Sterne's famous 1759 picaresque novel Tristram Shandy contains various references to the Nine Years' War, mostly the 1695 Second Siege of Namur. However, Corporal Trim refers to the Battle of Landen as follows:

Your honour remembers with concern, said the corporal, the total rout and confusion of our camp and army at the affair of Landen; every one was left to shift for himself; and if it had not been for the regiments of Wyndham, Lumley, and Galway, which covered the retreat over the bridge Neerspeeken, the king himself could scarce have gained it – he was press'd hard, as your honour knows, on every side of him...

It is during this battle that, seeing the French determination to gain the high ground in spite of the murderous Allied bombardment, William is alleged to have exclaimed "Oh! That insolent nation!".

References

Sources
 
 
 
 
 
 
 
 
 
 
 
 
 

 
 

1693 in France
Battles of the Nine Years' War
Battles involving France
Battles involving England
Battles involving the Spanish Netherlands
Battles involving the Dutch Republic
Conflicts in 1693
Battle
Battle